The Patents Act 2004 (c 16) is an Act of the Parliament of the United Kingdom. One of the purposes of the Act is to give effect to the revised European Patent Convention which was agreed by Diplomatic Conference in November 2000. It also amended employees' rights to compensation for inventions, to enable employee compensation "to be awarded in respect of all outstanding benefits deriving from a patented invention, removing the requirement for an employee to show that the patent itself is of outstanding benefit".

Section 1 - Methods of treatment or diagnosis
This section inserts section 4A of the Patents Act 1977 and defines the expression "the 1977 Act" for the purposes of this Act.

Section 17 - Commencement etc
The following orders have been made under this section:
The Patents Act 2004 (Commencement No. 1 and Consequential and Transitional Provisions) Order 2004 (S.I. 2004/2177 (C. 94))
The Patents Act 2004 (Commencement No. 2 and Consequential, etc. and Transitional Provisions) Order 2004 (S.I. 2004/3205 (C. 140))
The Patents Act 2004 (Commencement No. 3 and Transitional Provisions) Order 2005 (S.I. 2005/2471 (C. 105))
The Patents Act 2004 (Commencement No. 4 and Transitional Provisions) Order 2007 (S.I. 2007/3396 (C. 144))

See also
Patent Act
Halsbury's Statutes

References

External links
The Patents Act 2004, as amended from the National Archives.
The Patents Act 2004, as originally enacted from the National Archives.
Explanatory notes to the Patents Act 2004.

United Kingdom Acts of Parliament 2004
Patent legislation